is a Japanese politician of the Liberal Democratic Party, a member of the House of Councillors in the Diet (national legislature). A native of Kanazawa, Ishikawa and graduate of the University of Tokyo, he had worked at Hokkoku Shimbun, a regional newspaper in Kanazawa since 1989 and had served in the assembly of Ishikawa Prefecture since 2002. He was elected to the House of Councillors for the first time in 2004. He is the Minister in charge for regional revitalization under Prime Minister Fumio Kishida in the reshuffled Second Kishida Cabinet as of 10 August 2022.

References

External links 
  in Japanese.

Members of the House of Councillors (Japan)
Living people
1962 births
People from Kanazawa, Ishikawa
Liberal Democratic Party (Japan) politicians